The Corps Franconia München is a German Student Corps at the University of Munich. As a member of the Münchner Senioren Convent (SC) it is a member of the Kösener Senioren-Convents-Verband (KSCV, est. 1848), the oldest fraternity association in Germany, Austria and Switzerland.

History 
Franconia was established on 29 January 1836. Its motto is Gladius ultor noster.

Franconia München, Corps
Ludwig Maximilian University of Munich alumni
Student organizations established in 1836
1836 establishments in Germany